The 1999 Supersport World Championship was the first season of the Supersport World Championship, the third taking into account the previous two seasons, when the competition was known as Supersport World Series. For the first year, the series was recognised by the FIM as a World Championship instead of as an FIM Prize.

The season began on 28 March at Kyalami and finished on 12 September at Hockenheimring after 11 rounds. South African rider Brett MacLeod had a fatal accident at the Kyalami race. Stéphane Chambon won the riders' championship and Yamaha won the manufacturers' championship.

Race calendar and results

Championship standings

Riders' championship

Manufacturers' championship

References

External links

Supersport
Supersport World Championship seasons
1999 in Supersport racing